Barrs Court is an urban residential area in the unitary authority of South Gloucestershire to the East of the City & County of Bristol, England,

History
Barrs Court Moat was initially part of Kingswood Chase, a royal hunting forest (successor to the larger forest of Kingswood, deforested in 1228). It is now an ancient monument. The name comes from Lady Jane Barre who owned the land in the mid 15th Century. The moat itself borders a range of old ruins, these are of the large mansion owned by the Newton family, this stood until around 1740. One of these original outbuildings, the large cruciform tithe barn, was converted in the late 1980s into a public house.

There are a number of monuments in Bristol Cathedral to the Newton family.

References

Areas of Bristol